The Whitehawk Hill transmitting station (also known as the Whitehawk transmitting station) is a broadcasting and telecommunications facility located at Whitehawk, an eastern suburb of Brighton in the English city of Brighton and Hove. It is the city's main transmission facility for television and radio signals. It broadcasts digital television, FM and DAB radio to the coastal city of Brighton and Hove and to surrounding areas along the Sussex coast. It stopped broadcasting analogue television when the digital switchover occurred locally in March 2012.

Services broadcast include BBC One (South East), BBC Two, ITV (Meridian), Channel 4, BBC national radio stations, BBC Sussex and Heart Sussex.

History
A radar station was opened on the high ground of Whitehawk Hill, to the east of central Brighton, during World War II. Meanwhile, television broadcasts first reached the town in 1953 when a relay transmitter was erected on Truleigh Hill, several miles to the west on the South Downs. On 5 April 1959, after the wartime facility was demolished, a  transmitter was opened at Whitehawk. It took a feed from the Crystal Palace transmitting station until 14 April 1962; after that, signals were relayed from the Rowridge transmitting station. The original VHF signal was accompanied by colour UHF transmissions from 21 September 1970 (BBC1 and BBC2 only) until the VHF 405-line TV transmissions from this site ceased in 1983. UHF signals for ITV and Channel 4 followed from 28 April 1972 and 17 May 1983 respectively. Radio broadcasts started on 13 March 1967, in mono only; stereo transmissions commenced on 4 November 1972.

The original mast was replaced in 1983 by the present structure, which stood alongside it for a short time until the earlier mast was demolished. In 1990, the transmitting station was reported to serve 400,000 people and was supported by relay transmitters at several locations around Brighton: Patcham, Ovingdean and Saltdean (all installed in 1982–83), and Coldean and the North Laine area of central Brighton (both planned for 1990 but delayed).

Services available

Analogue radio

The coverage area of BBC Radio Sussex extends to Worthing, Haywards Heath, Uckfield and Eastbourne.  Other stations have smaller coverage areas from this transmitting station.

Digital radio

The Sussex Coast DAB ensemble includes BBC Radio Sussex, Capital, Gold Sussex, Heart South.

Digital television

The transmitting station provides Freeview television to 96,000 households. Since 28 August 2014, a local television station called Latest TV has been broadcast from LTVmux.

Whitehawk Hill completed the 700MHz Clearance Programme in November 2019 and ceased transmitting on UHF 51, UHF 53, UHF 54, UHF 57 and UHF 60.

Analogue television
Analogue television transmissions were turned off in two stages—on 7 March 2012 and 21 March 2012.  At this time, the local BBC service broadcast from the transmitter was changed from BBC South to BBC South East.

References

Bibliography

External links 
The Transmission Gallery: Whitehawk Hill

Brighton
Buildings and structures in Brighton and Hove
Transmitter sites in England